May I Borrow Your Girl Tonight? (Spanish:Préstamela esta noche) is a 1978 Spanish-Panamanian musical comedy film directed by Tulio Demicheli and starring Manolo Escobar, Perla Faith and Antonio Garisa.

Cast
 Manolo Escobar as Manolo  
 Perla Faith as Rita  
 Antonio Garisa as Indalecio  
 Narciso Ibáñez Menta as Renzo Ricciardi  
 Gilda Haddock as Anita  
 Mary Santpere as Rosa  
 Alejandro Ulloa as Sr. Perelló  
 Rafael Hernández as Taxista  
 María Vico as Sra. Ray  
 Gustavo Re as Pianista  
 Marilyn Pupo as Julia 
 José Sazatornil as Mr. Ray  
 Florencio Calpe as Epifanio  
 Asunción Vitoria as Hermana de Julia  
 Rosa Flores
 Emilio Pozo
 José Antonio Vilasaló
 José María Cases
 Mercedes Monterrey 
 Muniesa
 Manuel Bronchud as Vecino  
 Luis Induni as Comisario

References

Bibliography
 John King & Nissa Torrents. The Garden of Forking Paths: Argentine Cinema. British Film Institute, 1988.

External links 

1978 films
Panamanian comedy films
Spanish musical comedy films
1970s musical comedy films
1970s Spanish-language films
Films directed by Tulio Demicheli
1978 comedy films
1970s Spanish films